The Allied High Commission (also known as the High Commission for Occupied Germany, HICOG; in German Alliierte Hohe Kommission, AHK) was established by  the United States, the United Kingdom, and France after the 1948 breakdown of the Allied Control Council, to regulate and supervise the development of the newly established Federal Republic of Germany (West Germany).

The Commission took its seat at the Hotel Petersberg near Bonn and started its work on September 21, 1949. It ceased to function under the terms of the Bonn–Paris conventions, on May 5, 1955.

The Occupation Statute specified the prerogatives of the Western Allies vis-à-vis the West German government, and preserved the right to intervene in areas of military, economic, and foreign policy importance. These rights were revised in the Petersberg Agreement several weeks later.

With the creation of the Federal Republic and the institution of the High Commission, the position of the Military Governors was abolished. Instead each of the three Western Allies named a High Commissioner.

High commissioners

See also
Allied Occupation Zones in Germany
History of Germany since 1945

References
 About the Occupation Statute and the Allied High Commission (German)

Further reading
 Buse, Dieter K. and Doerr, Juergen C., eds. Modern Germany: An Encyclopedia of History, People, and Culture, 1871-1990  (2 vol. Garland, 1998) p 20.
 Garner, Curt. "Remaking German democracy in the 1950s: Was the civil service an asset or a liability?." German Politics 6.3 (1997): 16-53.
 Miller, Paul D. "A bibliographic essay on the Allied occupation and reconstruction of West Germany, 1945–1955." Small Wars & Insurgencies 24.4 (2013): 751-759.

 Plischke. Elmer. History of the Allied High Commission for Germany, Its Establishment, Structure, and Procedures ( Research Project No. 107 of the Allied High Commission for Germany. 1951) 122pp.

 Schwartz, Thomas Alan. America’s Germany: John J. McCloy and the Federal Republic of Germany (Harvard University Press, 2013).

External links

Records of the U.S. High Commissioner for Germany (USHCG) in the National Archives

West Germany
Aftermath of World War II in Germany
Allied occupation of Germany
Petersberg (Siebengebirge)
1949 establishments in West Germany
1955 disestablishments in West Germany